The 2001–02 UNC Wilmington Seahawks men's basketball team represented the University of North Carolina Wilmington during the 2001–02 NCAA Division I men's basketball season. The Seahawks, led by eighth-year head coach Jerry Wainwright, played their home games at the Trask Coliseum and were members of the Colonial Athletic Association (CAA).

After finishing atop the CAA regular season standings, the Seahawks won the CAA tournament to receive an automatic bid to the NCAA tournament as No. 13 seed in the South region. After upsetting No. 4 seed USC in the opening round, UNC Wilmington lost to eventual National runner-up Indiana in the Round of 32. As of 2021, this is the farthest a UNC Wilmington men's basketball team has advanced in NCAA Tournament play.

In addition to the school's first NCAA Tournament win and win over a ranked opponent, junior shooting guard Brett Blizzard became the first player in program history to be named CAA Player of the Year and an AP Honorable Mention All-American.

Roster

Schedule and results

|-
!colspan=9 style=| Regular season

|-
!colspan=9 style=| CAA tournament

|-
!colspan=9 style=| NCAA tournament

Awards and honors
Brett Blizzard – AP Honorable Mention All-American, CAA Player of the Year, CAA tournament MVP

References

UNC Wilmington Seahawks men's basketball seasons
Unc Wilmington
Unc Wilmington